Morice Ugochukwu Chukwu (born 27 July 1995 in Ebonyi) is a Nigerian professional footballer who plays as a defensive midfielder in Nigeria.

Career
Chukwu began his career with Nigeria Amateur League Division Two side Bussdor United F.C.

Go Round FC 
He later joined Go Round F.C. who signed him on a two-year contract on October 1, 2018.

Akwa United 
On October 28, 2019, ahead of 2019-2020 Nigerian Professional Football League season, he signed a two-year contract with Nigerian Professional Football League club Akwa United.

References

External links

1995 births
Living people
Nigerian footballers
Association football midfielders
Akwa United F.C. players
Nigeria Professional Football League players
People from Ebonyi State